Stone Cold may refer to:

Books
 Stone Cold (Swindells novel), a 1993 young adult novel by Robert Swindells
 Stone Cold (Parker novel), a 2003 novel by Robert B. Parker
 Stone Cold (Baldacci novel), a 2007 novel by David Baldacci
 Stone Cold, a 2012 novel by Joel Goldman

Film and television
 Stone Cold (1991 film), an American action film
 Stone Cold (2005 film), an American adaptation of the Parker novel
 Stone Cold (television series), a 1997 BBC adaptation of the Swindells novel

Music
 "Stone Cold" (Demi Lovato song), a song by Demi Lovato from the 2015 album Confident
 "Stone Cold" (Jimmy Barnes song) a song by Jimmy Barnes from the 1993 album Heat
 "Stone Cold" (Rainbow song), a song by British rock band Rainbow from the 1982 album Straight Between the Eyes
 "Stone Cold", a song by HammerFall from the 1997 album Glory to the Brave
 "Stone Cold", a song by FictionJunction

People with the name
 Stone Cold Steve Austin (born 1964), American actor and retired professional wrestler

See also
 
 Coldstone (disambiguation)